The foot per second (plural feet per second) is a unit of both speed (scalar) and velocity (vector quantity, which includes direction). It expresses the distance in feet (ft) traveled or displaced, divided by the time in seconds (s). The corresponding unit in the International System of Units (SI) is the meter per second.

Abbreviations include ft/s, fps, and the scientific notation ft s−1.

Conversions

See also
Foot per second squared, a corresponding unit of acceleration.
Feet per minute

References

Units of velocity
Customary units of measurement in the United States